is a professional wrestler best known for his time in Big Japan Pro Wrestling under the ring name Shadow WX. He debuted in 1995 in IWA Japan and moved to Big Japan in 1996, where he became a protege of Mr. Pogo and won the BJW Deathmatch Heavyweight Championship four times. His last match for BJW came on October 3, 2013, losing a Fluorescent Boards, Lemon and Salt Death Match to his longtime rival, The W*inger (formerly Shadow Winger).

On November 9, 2019, Shiga announced he was coming out of retirement and forming a new promotion operating out of Tokyo, Japan. Major Leaguers Wrestling (MLW) held their first events on December 13 & 15. In his return match, he defeated Necro Butcher. In August 2021, following the pandemic, he adopted the name Mr. Pogo III, after the late original, Tetsuo Sekigawa.

Championships and accomplishments
Big Japan Pro Wrestling
BJW Deathmatch Heavyweight Championship (4 times)
BJW World Tag Team Championship (3 times)
Falcon Cup (1998)

References

Japanese male professional wrestlers
Living people
1969 births
20th-century professional wrestlers
21st-century professional wrestlers
BJW Deathmatch Heavyweight Champions
BJW Tag Team Champions